The Roman Catholic Diocese of Nova Iguaçu is a diocese located in the city of Nova Iguaçu in the Ecclesiastical province of São Sebastião do Rio de Janeiro in Brazil.

History
 26 March 1960: Established as Diocese of Nova Iguaçu from the Diocese of Campos, Diocese of Niterói and Diocese of Valença

Bishops
 Bishops of Nova Iguaçu (Roman rite), in reverse chronological order
 Bishop Gilson Andrade da Silva (2019.05.15 - present)
 Bishop Luciano Bergamin, C.R.L. (2002.07.24 – 2019.05.15)
 Bishop Werner Franz Siebenbrock, S.V.D. (1994.11.09 – 2001.12.19), appointed Bishop of Governador Valadares, Minas Gerais
 Bishop Adriano Mandarino Hypólito, O.F.M. (1966.08.29 – 1994.11.09)
 Bishop Honorato Piazera, S.C.I. (1961.12.14 – 1966.02.12), appointed Coadjutor Bishop of Lages, Santa Catarina
 Bishop Walmor Battú Wichrowski (1960.04.23 – 1961.05.31)

Coadjutor bishop
Gilson Andrade da Silva (2018-2019)

References
 GCatholic.org
 Catholic Hierarchy
  Diocese website (Portuguese) 

Roman Catholic dioceses in Brazil
Christian organizations established in 1960
Nova Iguaçu, Roman Catholic Diocese of
Roman Catholic dioceses and prelatures established in the 20th century
1960 establishments in Brazil